Pokrovka may refer to:

Pokrovka, Russia, the name of multiple localities
Pokrovka, Kyrgyzstan, a village in Talas Province
Bolshaya Pokrovskaya Street, the main street in Nizhny Novgorod, Russia
Pokrovka, Donetsk Oblast, an urban-type settlement in Ukraine

Places formerly known as Pokrovka
Kuybyshev, Armenia, a town in Lori Province
Günəşli, Jalilabad, Azerbaijan, a village in the Jalilabad Rayon
Qaratəpə, Sabirabad, Azerbaijan, a village in the Sabirabad Rayon
Kyzyl-Suu, Kyrgyzstan, a village in the Issyk Kul Province
Chuy, Kyrgyzstan,  a village in the Chuy Province

See also
Pokrov (disambiguation)
Pokrovsky (disambiguation)
Pocrovca